Christopher Gilbert (born August 1, 1949, Birmingham, Alabama-July 5, 2007) was an American poet.

Life
He is the son of Floyd and Rosie (Walker) Gilbert.
He grew up in Lansing, Michigan.

He graduated from the University of Michigan in 1972, and PhD. in psychology from Clark University in 1986.

His work appears in African-American Literary Review, Callaloo, Crab Apple Review, Graham House Review, Indiana Review, Massachusetts Review, Ploughshares, Urbanus, William & Mary Review, and New York Quarterly.

His poem Any Good Throat, is on a monument in Jackson Square, Boston.

He lived in Providence, Rhode Island.

Awards
 1983 Walt Whitman Award
 1986 The Frost Place poet in residence

Works

Poetry

Anthologies

References

1949 births
2007 deaths
Writers from Birmingham, Alabama
Writers from Lansing, Michigan
University of Michigan alumni
Clark University alumni
American male poets
Poets from Michigan
Poets from Rhode Island
Writers from Providence, Rhode Island
Poets from Alabama
20th-century American poets
20th-century American male writers